Vincent Fernandez (born 31 January 1975) is a French former professional footballer who played as a goalkeeper.

Born in Saint-Germain-en-Laye, Yvelines, Fernandez began his career with Paris Saint-Germain. He was loaned to LB Châteauroux to experience first-team football and when he returned to PSG, he became sub for Bernard Lama, and then Dominique Casagrande. The 1997–98 season was one of his best, because even though he did not play much in the championship, he still won two cups, playing in both the Coupe de la Ligue final and the Coupe de France final against Bordeaux and Lens respectively. In 1998 FC Sochaux, who had recently reached Ligue 1, offered him a place, which he took up and kept until Teddy Richert convinced him to play for RC Strasbourg. He played there for two years, but did not manage to shine, so he moved to the Ligue 2 side Châteauroux. He played for the club as starting goalkeeper for 8 years.

References

Sportspeople from Saint-Germain-en-Laye
1975 births
Living people
Association football goalkeepers
French footballers
France under-21 international footballers
Footballers at the 1996 Summer Olympics
Olympic footballers of France
Paris Saint-Germain F.C. players
LB Châteauroux players
FC Sochaux-Montbéliard players
RC Strasbourg Alsace players
Ligue 1 players
Ligue 2 players
Championnat National players
Footballers from Yvelines